Eles Não Usam Black-tie (internationally released as They Don't Wear Black Tie) is a 1981 Brazilian drama film directed by Leon Hirszman, based on Gianfrancesco Guarnieri's play of the same name.

Plot 
The film revolves around a working-class family in São Paulo in 1980. Otávio, a syndicalist leader, and Romana are the parents of Tião, whose girlfriend, Maria, becomes pregnant. Fearing to be fired and thus unable to support his now fiancée, Tião does not participate on a strike, which starts a series of family conflicts.

Cast 
 Gianfrancesco Guarnieri as Otávio
 Fernanda Montenegro as Romana 
 Carlos Alberto Riccelli as Tião
 Bete Mendes as Maria
 Milton Gonçalves as Bráulio 
 Francisco Milani as Sartini
 Lélia Abramo as Maria's mother
 Fernando Ramos da Silva as Maria's brother

Reception
The film entered the competition at the 38th Venice International Film Festival, in which won the Special Jury Prize. It won the Best Film Award at the 3rd Havana Film Festival, at the 26th Valladolid International Film Festival, and shared with Plae Kao at the 3rd Three Continents Festival.

References

Further reading

External links

1981 films
Brazilian drama films
Films about Brazilian military dictatorship
Brazilian films based on plays
Films set in 1980
Films set in São Paulo
Venice Grand Jury Prize winners
Films about the labor movement
1981 drama films
1980s Portuguese-language films